Léonie Claudine Lougué Sorgho was the Minister of Health of Burkina Faso from 2019 to 2021.

Lougué Sorgho holds a Doctor of Medicine degree from Cheikh Anta Diop University in Dakar and a Certificate of Specialized Studies in Radiology and Medical Imaging from the International Center for the Training of Radiologists in Francophone Black Africa (CIFRAF) at the National University of the Ivory Coast.

References

Burkinabé political people
Health ministers of Burkina Faso
Living people
Year of birth missing (living people)
21st-century Burkinabé people